Getting Married (Swedish: Giftas) is a 1926 Swedish silent drama film directed by Olof Molander and starring Olof Winnerstrand, Tora Teje and Hilda Borgström. It is based on the short story collection Getting Married by August Strindberg, specifically the story A Doll's House which he had written is response to Henrik Ibsen's 1879 play A Doll's House.

Cast
 Olof Winnerstrand as Paul Rosenkrans
 Tora Teje as Signe Rosenkrans
 Hilda Borgström as 	Annie Behrman
 Margit Manstad as 	Lady from the train
 Uno Henning as Lieutenant
 Mona Geijer-Falkner as 	Annie's maid
 Einar Axelsson as Student

References

Bibliography
 Gustafsson, Tommy. Masculinity in the Golden Age of Swedish Cinema: A Cultural Analysis of 1920s Films. McFarland, 2014.

External links

1926 films
1926 drama films
Swedish drama films
Swedish silent feature films
Swedish black-and-white films
Films directed by Olof Molander
1920s Swedish-language films
Films based on works by August Strindberg
Films based on short fiction
Silent drama films
1920s Swedish films